Juneau is an American pop-punk band from Houston, Texas. formerly signed to Red Letter Records.  Their only full-length album, Safe & Sound was released on January 24, 2006.

History
Juneau began in 2005 as a screamo band. As the band moved further away from that genre to more pop-punk music, James "Jimmy" Hyland was relieved of his vocalist duties, and Justin Schultze assumed the role of lead vocalist.

During the recording process of their full-length album, Mike Eades was let go as guitarist, before recording on any tracks. Chris Soltani was brought on as lead guitarist and toured with the band during 2006, later leaving the band. He would be replaced by Nathan Gamez, until he also left the band in late 2007. Mike Eades rejoined the band in 2008 and has played with the band as lead guitarist since.

In late 2006, they released the single "Bittersweet Surprise".

In 2007, they were featured on the Ernie Ball Stage at Warped Tour in Houston, Texas. Later that summer, they also released a new single entitled "Drive".

Juneau has played with various bands, including Paramore, Plain White T's, Hit the Lights, Scary Kids Scaring Kids, Cute Is What We Aim For, The Matches, Halifax, and So They Say.

Discography

Full-Lengths
Safe & Sound (2006)

EPs
Victory Lights (2005)

Band members
Justin Schultze - lead vocals & guitar - (2005–present)
Kyle Jones - bass & backing vocals - (2005–present)
Mike Eades - guitar - (2005–2006, 2008–present)
Jordan Schultze - drums - (2005–present)

Past members
Nathan Gamez - guitar - (2007)
Chris Soltani - guitar - (2006)
James Hyland - unclean vocals - (2005)

References

External links
 Juneau Official MySpace Profile
 Juneau Official PureVolume Profile
 Juneau Official Twitter Profile

Musical groups from Houston